Germanium (32Ge) has five naturally occurring isotopes, 70Ge, 72Ge, 73Ge, 74Ge, and 76Ge. Of these, 76Ge is very slightly radioactive, decaying by double beta decay with a half-life of 1.78 × 1021 years (130 billion times the age of the universe).

Stable 74Ge is the most common isotope, having a natural abundance of approximately 36%. 76Ge is the least common with a natural abundance of approximately 7%. When bombarded with alpha particles, the isotopes 72Ge and 76Ge will generate stable 75As and 77Se, releasing high energy electrons in the process.

At least 27 radioisotopes have also been synthesized ranging in atomic mass from 58 to 89. The most stable of these is 68Ge, decaying by electron capture with a half-life of 270.95 d. It decays to the medically useful positron-emitting isotope 68Ga. (See gallium-68 generator for notes on the source of this isotope, and its medical use.) The least stable known germanium isotope is 60Ge with a half-life of 30 ms.

While most of germanium's radioisotopes decay by beta decay, 61Ge and 65Ge can also decay by β+-delayed proton emission. 84Ge through 87Ge also have minor β−-delayed neutron emission decay paths.

76Ge is used in experiments on the nature of neutrinos, by searching for neutrinoless double beta decay.

List of isotopes 

|-
| 58Ge
| style="text-align:right" | 32
| style="text-align:right" | 26
| 57.99101(34)#
|
| 2p
| 56Zn
| 0+
|
|
|-
| 59Ge
| style="text-align:right" | 32
| style="text-align:right" | 27
| 58.98175(30)#
|
| 2p
| 57Zn
| 7/2−#
|
|
|-
| rowspan=2|60Ge
| rowspan=2 style="text-align:right" | 32
| rowspan=2 style="text-align:right" | 28
| rowspan=2|59.97019(25)#
| rowspan=2|30# ms
| β+
| 60Ga
| rowspan=2|0+
| rowspan=2|
| rowspan=2|
|-
| 2p
| 58Zn
|-
| rowspan=2|61Ge
| rowspan=2 style="text-align:right" | 32
| rowspan=2 style="text-align:right" | 29
| rowspan=2|60.96379(32)#
| rowspan=2|39(12) ms
| β+, p (80%)
| 60Zn
| rowspan=2|(3/2−)#
| rowspan=2|
| rowspan=2|
|-
| β+ (20%)
| 61Ga
|-
| 62Ge
| style="text-align:right" | 32
| style="text-align:right" | 30
| 61.95465(15)#
| 129(35) ms
| β+
| 62Ga
| 0+
|
|
|-
| 63Ge
| style="text-align:right" | 32
| style="text-align:right" | 31
| 62.94964(21)#
| 142(8) ms
| β+
| 63Ga
| (3/2−)#
|
|
|-
| 64Ge
| style="text-align:right" | 32
| style="text-align:right" | 32
| 63.94165(3)
| 63.7(25) s
| β+
| 64Ga
| 0+
|
|
|-
| rowspan=2|65Ge
| rowspan=2 style="text-align:right" | 32
| rowspan=2 style="text-align:right" | 33
| rowspan=2|64.93944(11)
| rowspan=2|30.9(5) s
| β+ (99.99%)
| 65Ga
| rowspan=2|(3/2)−
| rowspan=2|
| rowspan=2|
|-
| β+, p (.01%)
| 64Zn
|-
| 66Ge
| style="text-align:right" | 32
| style="text-align:right" | 34
| 65.93384(3)
| 2.26(5) h
| β+
| 66Ga
| 0+
|
|
|-
| 67Ge
| style="text-align:right" | 32
| style="text-align:right" | 35
| 66.932734(5)
| 18.9(3) min
| β+
| 67Ga
| 1/2−
|
|
|-
| style="text-indent:1em" | 67m1Ge
| colspan="3" style="text-indent:2em" | 18.20(5) keV
| 13.7(9) μs
|
|
| 5/2−
|
|
|-
| style="text-indent:1em" | 67m2Ge
| colspan="3" style="text-indent:2em" | 751.70(6) keV
| 110.9(14) ns
|
|
| 9/2+
|
|
|-
| 68Ge
| style="text-align:right" | 32
| style="text-align:right" | 36
| 67.928094(7)
| 271.05(8) d 
| EC
| 68Ga
| 0+
|
|
|-
| 69Ge
| style="text-align:right" | 32
| style="text-align:right" | 37
| 68.9279645(14)
| 39.05(10) h
| β+
| 69Ga
| 5/2−
|
|
|-
| style="text-indent:1em" | 69m1Ge
| colspan="3" style="text-indent:2em" | 86.765(14) keV
| 5.1(2) μs
|
|
| 1/2−
|
|
|-
| style="text-indent:1em" | 69m2Ge
| colspan="3" style="text-indent:2em" | 397.944(18) keV
| 2.81(5) μs
|
|
| 9/2+
|
|
|-
| 70Ge
| style="text-align:right" | 32
| style="text-align:right" | 38
| 69.9242474(11)
| colspan=3 align=center|Stable
| 0+
| 0.2038(18)
|
|-
| 71Ge
| style="text-align:right" | 32
| style="text-align:right" | 39
| 70.9249510(11)
| 11.43(3) d
| EC
| 71Ga
| 1/2−
|
|
|-
| style="text-indent:1em" | 71mGe
| colspan="3" style="text-indent:2em" | 198.367(10) keV
| 20.40(17) ms
| IT
| 71Ge
| 9/2+
|
|
|-
| 72Ge
| style="text-align:right" | 32
| style="text-align:right" | 40
| 71.9220758(18)
| colspan=3 align=center|Stable
| 0+
| 0.2731(26)
|
|-
| style="text-indent:1em" | 72mGe
| colspan="3" style="text-indent:2em" | 691.43(4) keV
| 444.2(8) ns
|
|
| 0+
|
|
|-
| 73Ge
| style="text-align:right" | 32
| style="text-align:right" | 41
| 72.9234589(18)
| colspan=3 align=center|Stable
| 9/2+
| 0.0776(8)
|
|-
| style="text-indent:1em" | 73m1Ge
| colspan="3" style="text-indent:2em" | 13.2845(15) keV
| 2.92(3) μs
|
|
| 5/2+
|
|
|-
| style="text-indent:1em" | 73m2Ge
| colspan="3" style="text-indent:2em" | 66.726(9) keV
| 499(11) ms
|
|
| 1/2−
|
|
|-
| 74Ge
| style="text-align:right" | 32
| style="text-align:right" | 42
| 73.9211778(18)
| colspan=3 align=center|Stable
| 0+
| 0.3672(15)
|
|-
| 75Ge
| style="text-align:right" | 32
| style="text-align:right" | 43
| 74.9228589(18)
| 82.78(4) min
| β−
| 75As
| 1/2−
|
|
|-
| rowspan=2 style="text-indent:1em" | 75m1Ge
| rowspan=2 colspan="3" style="text-indent:2em" | 139.69(3) keV
| rowspan=2|47.7(5) s
| IT (99.97%)
| 75Ge
| rowspan=2|7/2+
| rowspan=2|
| rowspan=2|
|-
| β−
| 75As
|-
| style="text-indent:1em" | 75m2Ge
| colspan="3" style="text-indent:2em" | 192.18(7) keV
| 216(5) ns
|
|
| 5/2+
|
|
|-
| 76Ge
| style="text-align:right" | 32
| style="text-align:right" | 44
| 75.9214026(18)
| 
| β−β−
| 76Se
| 0+
| 0.0783(7)
|
|-
| 77Ge
| style="text-align:right" | 32
| style="text-align:right" | 45
| 76.9235486(18)
| 11.30(1) h
| β−
| 77As
| 7/2+
| 
| 
|-
| rowspan=2 style="text-indent:1em" | 77mGe
| rowspan=2 colspan="3" style="text-indent:2em" | 159.70(10) keV
| rowspan=2|52.9(6) s
| β− (79%)
| 77As
| rowspan=2|1/2−
| rowspan=2|
| rowspan=2|
|-
| IT (21%)
| 77Ge
|-
| 78Ge
| style="text-align:right" | 32
| style="text-align:right" | 46
| 77.922853(4)
| 88(1) min
| β−
| 78As
| 0+
|
|
|-
| 79Ge
| style="text-align:right" | 32
| style="text-align:right" | 47
| 78.9254(1)
| 18.98(3) s
| β−
| 79As
| (1/2)−
|
|
|-
| rowspan=2 style="text-indent:1em" | 79mGe
| rowspan=2 colspan="3" style="text-indent:2em" | 185.95(4) keV
| rowspan=2|39.0(10) s
| β− (96%)
| 79As
| rowspan=2|(7/2+)#
| rowspan=2|
| rowspan=2|
|-
| IT (4%)
| 79Ge
|-
| 80Ge
| style="text-align:right" | 32
| style="text-align:right" | 48
| 79.92537(3)
| 29.5(4) s
| β−
| 80As
| 0+
|
|
|-
| 81Ge
| style="text-align:right" | 32
| style="text-align:right" | 49
| 80.92882(13)
| 7.6(6) s
| β−
| 81As
| 9/2+#
|
|
|-
| rowspan=2 style="text-indent:1em" | 81mGe
| rowspan=2 colspan="3" style="text-indent:2em" | 679.13(4) keV
| rowspan=2|7.6(6) s
| β− (99%)
| 81As
| rowspan=2|(1/2+)
| rowspan=2|
| rowspan=2|
|-
| IT (1%)
| 81Ge
|-
| 82Ge
| style="text-align:right" | 32
| style="text-align:right" | 50
| 81.92955(26)
| 4.55(5) s
| β−
| 82As
| 0+
|
|
|-
| 83Ge
| style="text-align:right" | 32
| style="text-align:right" | 51
| 82.93462(21)#
| 1.85(6) s
| β−
| 83As
| (5/2+)#
|
|
|-
| rowspan=2|84Ge
| rowspan=2 style="text-align:right" | 32
| rowspan=2 style="text-align:right" | 52
| rowspan=2|83.93747(32)#
| rowspan=2|0.947(11) s
| β− (89.2%)
| 84As
| rowspan=2|0+
| rowspan=2|
| rowspan=2|
|-
| β−, n (10.8%)
| 83As
|-
| rowspan=2|85Ge
| rowspan=2 style="text-align:right" | 32
| rowspan=2 style="text-align:right" | 53
| rowspan=2|84.94303(43)#
| rowspan=2|535(47) ms
| β− (86%)
| 85As
| rowspan=2|5/2+#
| rowspan=2|
| rowspan=2|
|-
| β−, n (14%)
| 84As
|-
| rowspan=2|86Ge
| rowspan=2 style="text-align:right" | 32
| rowspan=2 style="text-align:right" | 54
| rowspan=2|85.94649(54)#
| rowspan=2|>150 ns
| β−, n
| 85As
| rowspan=2|0+
| rowspan=2|
| rowspan=2|
|-
| β−
| 86As
|-
| 87Ge
| style="text-align:right" | 32
| style="text-align:right" | 55
| 86.95251(54)#
| 0.14# s
|
|
| 5/2+#
|
|
|-
| 88Ge
| style="text-align:right" | 32
| style="text-align:right" | 56
| 87.95691(75)#
| >=300 ns
|
|
| 0+
|
|
|-
| 89Ge
| style="text-align:right" | 32
| style="text-align:right" | 57
| 88.96383(97)#
| >150 ns
|
|
| 3/2+#
|
|

 Angular momentum or 3rd order sub particles are omitted as spin(2)=0,45,45.

References 
 Isotope masses from:

 Isotopic compositions and standard atomic masses from:

 Half-life, spin, and isomer data selected from the following sources.

 
Germanium
Germanium